Wood v Schaeffer is a significant ruling of the Supreme Court of Canada concerning procedural requirements involving incidents arising from police misconduct.

Background

In June 2009, in two separate incidents, officers of the Ontario Provincial Police shot and killed suspects (Minty and Schaeffer) in their investigations. Ontario's Special Investigations Unit, as required by provincial law, investigated and reported. In the Minty investigation, the SIU Director concluded that "the lethal force used was not excessive" in the circumstances, but indicated that all witness officers had been instructed not to write up their notes until they had spoken to counsel. In the Schaeffer investigation, the Director concluded that he could not form reasonable and probable grounds to believe that a criminal offence had been committed, as he could not rely on the information supplied by the police officers. He stated:

The families of the deceased suspects initiated an action in the Ontario Superior Court of Justice for a declaration as to the nature of the police duty to cooperate with the SIU's investigations. The officers sought to have the application struck out on grounds of non-justiciability and standing.

The courts below

At first instance, Low J allowed the officers' motion and struck the application, declaring:

On appeal to the Ontario Court of Appeal, the ruling was set aside. In a unanimous opinion, Sharpe JA held that the application was justiciable, that the families had public interest standing, and that the Court of Appeal had jurisdiction to decide the substantive issues raised in the application without the need to remit the matter to the Superior Court. However, he stated that a declaration could not be granted in the broad terms originally sought:

The matter was taken to the Supreme Court of Canada:

 The officers appealed, asserting that the Court of Appeal erred in restricting the entitlement to counsel to nothing more than "basic legal advice". 
 The SIU Director cross-appealed, arguing that, although the Court of Appeal was correct in holding that officers are not entitled to the assistance of counsel in the preparation of their notes, it erred in concluding that police officers are entitled to "basic legal advice" prior to completing their notes.
 The families and the Commissioner of the Ontario Provincial Police were content with the decision of the Court of Appeal and defended its correctness.

At the Supreme Court of Canada

The SCC unanimously agreed that the appeal should be dismissed, and by 6-3 allowed the cross-appeal. It accordingly issued the declaration sought in these terms:

Appeal

In his ruling, Moldaver J stated:

 The right to counsel arose under s. 7(1) of the Regulation, which is distinct from the s. 10(b) right to counsel under the Canadian Charter of Rights and Freedoms. As interveners, the Canadian Civil Liberties Association and the Canadian Police Association tried to argue that the Charter right had been triggered, but these pleadings were struck out as the main parties had not raised that issue.
 The officers argued that, no matter how s. 7(1) is interpreted, they were free at common law to consult with counsel in the preparation of their notes. The SCC disagreed, as the case dealt with officers not as ordinary citizens, but in their professional capacity as subjects in a SIU investigation, and the regulation comprehensively sets out all the rights and duties in the matter.
 The s. 7(1) right to counsel must be read restrictively, in order not to interfere with the officers' duty under s. 9 to take notes, thus giving a harmonious interpretation to the regulatory scheme.

Cross-appeal

In dismissing the cross-appeal, Moldaver J held that even the perfunctory consultation contemplated by the Court of Appeal was liable to cause an "appearances problem," while LeBel and Cromwell JJ felt that the Court of Appeal was essentially correct in determining how and when the right to consult with counsel should not be exercised.

Impact

The SIU and the families welcomed it, but police unions such as the Ontario Provincial Police Association claimed that police officers now have less protection than the rest of Canada.

There also continues to be controversy as to the lack of support given to the SIU by the provincial government in pursuing its role in this case and others, which has attracted criticism from the Ontario Ombudsman.

Notes

References

External links
 

Supreme Court of Canada cases
Canadian administrative case law
Canadian criminal procedure case law
2013 in Canadian case law
Police misconduct in Canada